Ozzie Virgil may refer to:
Ozzie Virgil, Sr. (born 1932), Major League Baseball utility player
Ozzie Virgil, Jr. (born 1956), Major League Baseball All-Star catcher